Harvinder is a given name. Notable people with the name include:

Harvinder "Harry" Anand, American politician
Harvinder Kalyan, Indian politician
Harvinder Mankkar, Indian writer, illustrator, and film director
Harvinder Sahota, Indian-American cardiologist
Harvinder Singh, Indian cricketer
Harvinder Sodhi, Indian cricketer